Mohamed Haddou Chiguer (1932 – 15 February 2022) was a Moroccan politician. A member of the National Rally of Independents, he served as Minister of the Interior from 1975 to 1977. He died in Rabat on 15 February 2022, at the age of 90.

References

1932 births
2022 deaths
Moroccan politicians
Government ministers of Morocco
National Rally of Independents politicians
People from Rabat-Salé-Kénitra